The Typhoon is a type of remote weapon station manufactured by Rafael Advanced Defense Systems of Israel, and it shares similar design principles and common technologies with Samson Remote Controlled Weapon Station (Samson RCWS), a land-based system manufactured by the same developer. Like Samson RCWS, Typhoon is also multi-configurable.

The Typhoon, and its lightweight variant, Mini Typhoon, are used by the Israeli Navy, Indian Navy, Philippine Navy, Royal Australian Navy, Royal New Zealand Navy, the Republic of Singapore Navy, Sri Lankan Navy and Singapore's Police Coast Guard.

Overview 
The first Typhoon, the Mk-23, was released in 1997. The weapon is mounted on a stabilized deck mounting which allows it to remain on target as the platform beneath it moves.

The mounting does not penetrate the platform, making it relatively simple to fit the weapon to ships. Typhoon can use sights attached to the weapon mount or it can receive inputs from an independent Electro-Optical Detector (EOD) or Fire Control Radar (FCR). Using its own sight the Typhoon system can provide firing solutions entirely without outside assistance, allowing it to function fully independently.

The cannon system mounted can be an ATK, Oerlikon, Mauser or Giat model in the 20–30 mm caliber range. Between 160 and 210 rounds are carried on the mounting, depending on the caliber. The mount can traverse 120° to either side and elevate between -12.5° and 40.5°. The weight of a complete system is between  without ammunition, depending on the guns and sensors mounted.

By 2006, more than 120 Typhoon systems had been ordered.

Variants

Mini Typhoon 
Mini Typhoon is a lightweight, remote-controlled weapon station based on the Typhoon. It can be fitted with a 12.7 mm (.50) machine gun, a 7.62 mm machine gun, or a 40 mm grenade launcher, with a magazine of up to 230 rounds. The mini Typhoon is also mounted on the Protector USV (unmanned surface vehicle) as the Mk49 Mod 0.

Typhoon Mk-30c 
Typhoon Mk-30c is a new variant equipped with the 30 mm Mk44 Bushmaster II and 200 ready use rounds.

Operators

Current operators 

 Adelaide-class frigate (retired) – Mini Typhoon as a temporary mount for deployments to the Middle East.
 Arafura-class offshore patrol vessel
 Armidale-class patrol boat – 25 mm M242 Bushmaster
 Anzac-class frigate – Mini Typhoon as a temporary mount for deployments to the Middle East.
 Canberra-class landing helicopter dock
 Hobart-class destroyer – 25 mm M242 Bushmaster
 Supply-class replenishment oiler – 25 mm M242 Bushmaster

  - Mini Typhoon as mount
  - Mk 38 Mod 2 as main gun

 Super Dvora Mk II-class patrol boat

 - with M242 Bushmasters
 Shaldag-class patrol boat
 Super Dvora Mk II-class patrol boat
 Super Dvora Mk III-class patrol boat
 Sa'ar 4.5-class missile boat

 Colombo-class FACs

 Anzac-class frigate – Mini Typhoon as a permanent mount with M2 Browning machine guns
 Protector-class offshore patrol vessel – 1 x 25 mm
 HMNZS Aotearoa - Mini Typhoon as a permanent mount

 Endurance-class landing platform dock – 2× 25mm Mk 38 Mod 2 (mounted amidships on port and starboard side)
 Formidable-class frigate Mk 38 Mod 2
 Bedok-class mine countermeasures vessel – Mk 25
 Protector USV – Mini Typhoon Mk49 Mod0
 New Coastal Patrol Craft (NCPC) for the Police Coast Guard.

 Del Pilar-class offshore patrol vessel – Mk 38 Mod 2
 Multi-purpose Attack Craft – Mini Typhoon and Typhoon MLS-ER
 Nestor Acero-class patrol boat

 Saryu-class advanced offshore patrol vessels – 2× 30 mm Mk44 Bushmaster II (mounted amidships on port and starboard side)
 Colombo class FACs
 Shaldag-class patrol boat
 Super Dvora Mk II-class patrol boat
 Super Dvora Mk III-class patrol boat

 Typhoon Weapon System has been selected by the US Navy, designated Mk 38 Mod 2, and provided by the US-located branch of the UK-headquartered company BAE Systems teamed with Rafael. Following upgrades which expanded the ships it could be mounted on, improved its optics, and added a co-axial 7.62mm machine gun, it received the designation Mk 38 Mod 3.
 Mini-Typhoon selected by the US Navy as the Remote Operated Small Arms Mount (ROSAM), designated Mk 49 Mod 0, and a later model Mk 49 Mod 1. The combination Spike missile/12.7mm armed variant has been tested on an unmanned vessel.

References 
Notes

External links 
 
 TYPHOON Naval Stabilized Weapon Station
 MINI-TYPHOON Naval Stabilized Weapon Station

Video links
 

Rafael Advanced Defense Systems
Weapons of Israel
Remote weapon stations
Military equipment introduced in the 1990s